Fethi Heper  (born 3 February 1944 in Eskişehir) is a retired Turkish professional footballer who was the top goal scorer of Eskişehirspor. Following retirement, he became a university finance professor.

Heper scored many goals during his career, and was the leading scorer in the Turkish Super Lig during the 1969–70 and 1971–72 seasons. He made three appearances for the Turkey national football team.

After his football career, he became a lecturer. He is currently a finance professor at Anadolu University.

He graduated for his licence Faculty of Economic and Administrative Sciences in Eskişehir in 1967. Afterwards, he finished his doctor's degree in 1978.

References

1944 births
Living people
Sportspeople from Eskişehir
Turkish footballers
Turkey international footballers
Eskişehirspor footballers
Süper Lig players
Academic staff of Anadolu University
Association football forwards